Brazil (BRA) has sent athletes to every celebration of the  Parapan American Games. The Brazilian Paralympic Committee (CPB) is the National Paralympic Committee for the Brazil.

Medal tables

Medals by Summer Games

Medals by sport
''As of the conclusion of the 2019 Parapan American Games

See also
Brazil at the Pan American Games
Brazil at the Junior Pan American Games
Brazil at the Paralympics

References

Nations at the Parapan American Games
 
Parapan American Games